Lewisham is a London borough in south-east London; it forms part of Inner London. The principal settlement of the borough is Lewisham. The local authority is Lewisham London Borough Council, based in Catford. The Prime Meridian passes through Lewisham. Blackheath, Goldsmiths, University of London and Millwall F.C. are located within the borough.

History 
The borough was formed in 1965, by the London Government Act 1963, as an amalgamation of the former area of the Metropolitan Borough of Lewisham and the Metropolitan Borough of Deptford, which had been created in 1900 as divisions of the County of London.

Minor boundary changes have occurred since its creation. The most significant amendments were made in 1996, when the former area of the Royal Docks in Deptford was transferred from the London Borough of Greenwich.

The metropolitan borough of Lewisham corresponded to the ancient parishes of Lee and Lewisham and the borough of Deptford corresponded to the parish of Deptford St Paul, including Hatcham. Prior to becoming part of the County of London in 1889, Hatcham was part of Surrey and the rest was part of Kent.

Geography

The borough is surrounded by the Royal Borough of Greenwich to the east (where the border runs between Deptford and Horn Park), the London Borough of Bromley to the south (where the border runs between Horn Park and Crystal Palace Park), and the London Borough of Southwark to the west ( where the border runs between Crystal Palace Park and Rotherhithe). The River Thames forms a short section of northern boundary with the Isle of Dogs in the London Borough of Tower Hamlets. Deptford Creek, Pool River, River Quaggy and River Ravensbourne pass through the borough.
Major landmarks include All Saints Church in Blackheath, the Citibank Tower in Lewisham, Dietrich Bonhoeffer Church (Sydenham's German Church, technically located in Forest Hill) and the Horniman Museum in Forest Hill. Millwall F.C. are based in the borough, their stadium The Den being located in South Bermondsey.

Demographics

According to the 2011 census, Lewisham has a population of 275,885, is 53% white and 47% , and 43% of households are owner-occupiers.

A 2017 report by Trust for London and the New Policy Institute found that Lewisham has a poverty rate of 26%, close to the London-wide figure of 27%.

Ethnicity

Religion

The following table shows the religious identity of residents residing in Lewisham according to 2021 census results

Civic affairs

Motto 
The motto of the borough is "Salus Populi Suprema Lex", which means (roughly translated) "The welfare of the people [is] the highest law."

Administration 

The current Chief Executive is Kim Wright. The borough is administered by the four directorates of the council: Children and Young People, Community Services, Customer Services, and Resources & Regeneration.

Twinning 

The borough is twinned with the following towns:
  Charlottenburg, Berlin, Germany
  Antony, Hauts-de-Seine, France
  Matagalpa, Nicaragua

The borough has also signed a "friendship link" with Ekurhuleni, near Johannesburg, South Africa.

Freedom of the Borough 
The honour of Freedom of the Borough has been awarded to:

 Alan Milner Smith, OBE, Town Clerk (9 December 1971)
 Frederick William Winslade, Esq., JP, appointed OBE for services to local government in Lewisham and Camberwell New Year Honours 1967 and CBE for services to local government in Lewisham Birthday Honours 1978(28 November 1975)
 Daisy Amelia Elizabeth Hurren (10 October 1985)
 Alfred Anderson Hawkins (30 March 1990)
 The Most Reverend Desmond Tutu (4 May 1990)
 Terry Waite, CBE (16 November 1992)
 The Reverend Sybil Theodora Phoenix, MBE, MS [Medal of Service, Co-operative Republic of Guyana] (8 March 1996)
 Dame Cicely Saunders, OM, DBE (10 March 2000)
 James Leslie Hicks ('Les') Eytle (8 June 2007)
 Dame Erica Pienaar (2013)
 Baroness (Doreen) Lawrence of Clarendon OBE, (2014)
 Dame Joan Ruddock (2016)
 Bridget Prentice (2016)

Politics

Wards 

The London Borough of Lewisham is divided into 18 wards, first used in the 2002 elections, they are:
Bellingham
Blackheath
Brockley
Catford
Crofton Park
Downham
Evelyn
Forest Hill
Grove Park
Ladywell
Lee Green
Lewisham Central
New Cross
Perry Vale
Rushey Green
Sydenham
Telegraph Hill
Whitefoot

New wards will be adopted at the 2022 election.

Previous wards 

Previously the borough was divided into 26 wards and 6 areas, used for elections from 1978 to 1998. Some of these former wards had the same names as the present wards, but their borders were different. When the wards were revised for 2002, some became larger, absorbing parts of other previous wards, the number of wards changed from 26 to 18. The previous wards and areas used from 1978 to 1998 were:

London Borough Council 

Lewisham's council, unlike most English councils, is led by a directly elected mayor. The first mayoral election was in 2002 and was won by the Labour Party candidate, Steve Bullock, who was re-elected in 2006, 2010 and 2014. Following the 2018 council elections, there are 54 Labour Party councillors and none for other parties. The current mayor is Damien Egan.

Westminster Parliament 

The borough includes the constituencies of Lewisham Deptford, Lewisham West and Penge and Lewisham East.

These are the MPs who have represented constituencies covered by the borough since its formation in 1964. Note that constituencies change their boundaries over time, even where names remain the same.

Education

The London's Poverty Profile, a report by Trust for London and the New Policy Institute, found that 42% of 19-year-olds in Lewisham lack level 3 qualifications. This is the 3rd worst rate out of 32 boroughs.

In 2018, Lewisham had the third highest rate of exclusions of pupils from secondary schools of any area in England.

Transport

Lewisham station, once known as Lewisham Junction, is located at the junction of the lines to Dartford and Hayes, and is also the terminus of the southern branch of the Docklands Light Railway.

The East London Line (on the London Underground network) terminated at New Cross and New Cross Gate until December 2007. An extension to this line opened on 23 May 2010, serving Brockley, Honor Oak Park, Forest Hill, and Sydenham. This forms part of the London Overground network.

The South London Line runs along the extreme North West of the borough, at present there are no stations that are within the borough. There is a proposal for a new station at  providing a link to Clapham Junction.

Railway stations

DLR stations

Deptford Bridge – on the border between Lewisham and Greenwich.
Elverson Road – on the border between Lewisham and Greenwich.
Lewisham

London Underground

There are no Tube stations currently in the borough, as the East London Line has been part of London Overground since 2006. However, an extension of the Bakerloo line beyond Elephant & Castle to Lewisham and Hayes has been proposed.

Cycling
Quietway one links Lewisham to Greenwich and in toward central London

One Cycle Superhighways will operate through Lewisham in the future.

CS4 – Will along Deptford's Evelyn Street (A200). Will operate between Greenwich and Tower Bridge. Construction will start in Summer 2019

Main roads

A2 from the border with Old Kent Road in the west to Kidbrooke in the east.
A20 from New Cross to the border with Eltham in the east.
A21 from Lewisham to the border with Bromley in the south.
A202 from New Cross Gate to the border with Peckham in the west.
A205 (South Circular Road) passes through the centre of the borough from the border with Dulwich in the west to Eltham in the east. Except for a short section in Lee as it approaches Eltham, it is purely a one-lane-each-way road.

Travel to work
In March 2011, the main forms of transport that residents used to travel to work were: train, 18.6% of all residents aged 16–74; driving a car or van, 11.2%; bus, minibus or coach, 11.2%; underground, metro, light rail, tram, 9.7%; on foot, 4.3%; work mainly at or from home, 2.8%; bicycle, 2.6%.

48% of households in the borough are car free, compared to 42% across Greater London.

Culture
Lewisham won London Borough of Culture for 2020. The prestigious award, is  a major initiative launched by the Mayor of London in June 2017, will see Lewisham receive £1.35 million to stage an ambitious, year-long programme of cultural events celebrating the wealth of creative talent in the borough and delivering lasting social change.

Sport and leisure
Millwall Football Club was originally formed in 1885, in Millwall on the Isle of Dogs, East London. They retained the name, even though they moved across the river to New Cross, South London in 1910. In 1993 they moved to their current stadium, The Den which is in Bermondsey, but falls under the Borough of Lewisham. The Borough has a Non-League football club Lewisham Borough Football Club, who play at the Ladywell Arena, Catford.

See also
List of people from Lewisham
List of public art in Lewisham

References

External links 

 Lewisham London Borough Council

 
Lewisham
Lewisham
1965 establishments in the United Kingdom